Mairena del Aljarafe is a municipality in the province of Seville, Spain. In 2009, it had a population of 40,700 inhabitants. Its superficial extension is 17,7 km2 (6.83 sq. mi.) and has a population density of 2,470.23 inhabitants/km2

References

Municipalities of the Province of Seville